NVIS can refer to:
Near Vertical Incidence Skywave
Night Vision Imaging System